Louis Poznański (born 24 May 2001) is a German-Polish professional footballer who plays as a left-back for Ekstraklasa club Lechia Gdańsk.

Career
On 22 February 2023, Poznański signed with Ekstraklasa club Lechia Gdańsk until the end of the year, with an option to extend his deal until June 2026.

References

External links
 
 

2001 births
Living people
Footballers from Bremen
German footballers
German people of Polish descent
Association football defenders
Poland youth international footballers
Germany youth international footballers
Regionalliga players
Super League Greece players
SV Werder Bremen II players
PAS Giannina F.C. players
Lechia Gdańsk players
German expatriate footballers
German expatriate sportspeople in Greece
Expatriate footballers in Greece
German expatriate sportspeople in Poland
Expatriate footballers in Poland